Coleophora strophingella is a moth of the family Coleophoridae that can be found in Algeria and Iran.

References

External links

strophingella
Moths of Africa
Moths of Asia
Moths described in 1994